Willy Schröder (7 March 1912 – 28 September 1990) was a German athlete who competed in the 1936 Summer Olympics in the men's discus throw event, finishing in 5th place. In 1935 he set a discus world record of 53.10 m in a competition in his hometown of Magdeburg.

References

1912 births
1990 deaths
German male discus throwers
Olympic athletes of Germany
Athletes (track and field) at the 1936 Summer Olympics
European Athletics Championships medalists
Sportspeople from Magdeburg